Luis Orán Castañeda Ramos (10 October 1979 — 14 July 2020) was a Colombian road cyclist. He rode the 2000 Giro d'Italia.

After his cycling career, he worked in a factory. On 14 July 2020, he died after an accident with a conveyor belt, aged 40.

Teams
 2000 Vitalicio Seguros-Grupo Generali (Spain) 
 2001–2003 05 Orbitel (Colombia) 
 2007 Colombia Es Pasion (Colombia)

Achievements
1998
2nd General classification Vuelta de la Juventud Guatemala
1st stage 9 Vuelta a Costa Rica
1st stage 12 Vuelta a Costa Rica

1999
 Colombian road championships (U23)
 Colombian time trial championships (U23)
2nd General classification Vuelta de la Juventud Guatemala

2001
 1st stage 2 (team time trial) 2001 Vuelta a Colombia

2002
1st Stage 3 Vuelta al Tolima
1st Stage 8 2002 Vuelta a Colombia

References

1979 births
2020 deaths
Colombian male cyclists
Industrial accident deaths
Place of birth missing
Place of death missing
20th-century Colombian people
21st-century Colombian people